Calicorema is a genus of flowering plants belonging to the family Amaranthaceae.

Its native range is Southern Africa.

Species:

Calicorema capitata 
Calicorema squarrosa

References

Amaranthaceae
Amaranthaceae genera